The Chandler House at 167 S. Main St. in Walton, Kentucky was built in the 1920s.  It was listed on the National Register of Historic Places in 1989.

It is a -story house.  It has a contemporary single-car hipped roof garage.

References

National Register of Historic Places in Boone County, Kentucky
Houses completed in the 20th century
1920s establishments in Kentucky
Houses on the National Register of Historic Places in Kentucky
Bungalow architecture in Kentucky
American Craftsman architecture in Kentucky
Houses in Boone County, Kentucky